Konrad Hubert, also Konrad Huber, Konrad Huober, or Konrad Humbert (1507 – 13 April 1577), was a German Reformed theologian, hymn writer and reformer. He was for 18 years the assistant of Martin Bucer at St. Thomas, Strasbourg.

Life
Hubert was born in Bergzabern. He attended a school in Heidelberg from 1519. From 1526, he studied in Basel. He stayed with Johannes Oecolampadius who influenced him. He had the chance to meet numerous people with whom he corresponded later, including Johannes Oporinus, Thomas Plater and Johann Gast.

After the battle at Kappel am Albis, Oecolampadius recommended him to his friend Martin Bucer who accepted him as his assistant (diaconus) in Strasbourg at St. Thomas. When Bucer was on his frequent travels, Hubert stepped in for him. Hubert worked for Bucer dutifully for 18 years. It was part of his job to make Bucer's ideas and concepts readable, because Bucer's handwriting was difficult to read. When Bucer left his post in 1549 and fled to England, Johann Marbach introduced Lutheranism. Hubert did not agree, he was expelled from the "Kirchenkonvent" in 1562 and was dismissed from St. Thomas in 1563. After that he worked as a free-lance preacher.

After Bucer's death in 1551, Hubert planned to publish Bucer's works which were extant in prints and manuscripts. He faced opposition and withdrew from church life more and more. In 1556 he seemed close to publishing the works with the help of Johannes Sturm at Oporinus in Basel. However, only the first volume was published, titled "Martini Buceri scripta Anglicana fere omnia" in 1577. Hubert edited the Strasbourg hymnals of 1560 and 1572. He died in Strasbourg.

Hymns
He is remembered for his hymns. He wrote the hymn "Allein zu dir, Herr Jesu Christ", published in 1540, used by Johann Sebastian Bach as the base for his chorale cantata Allein zu dir, Herr Jesu Christ, BWV 33 in 1724. Hubert's hymn "O Gott, du höchster Gnadenhort" is part of the hymnal of the Evangelical Church in Germany (EG 194).

References

External links 
 Konrad Hubert Carus-Verlag

16th-century German Protestant theologians
German male non-fiction writers
16th-century Calvinist and Reformed theologians
German Protestant hymnwriters
1507 births
1577 deaths
16th-century hymnwriters
16th-century German male writers